Kalyani Roy (born 14 January 1967) is an Indian politician, representing Bharatiya Janata Party and serving as the present Government Chief Whip of Tripura Legislative Assembly and MLA of Teliamura constituency since March, 2018. She is the first woman to hold the office of Government Chief Whip in the state of Tripura, India.

References

Living people
1967 births
Bharatiya Janata Party politicians from Assam
Tripura MLAs 2018–2023